Santa Clara is a community in Lane County, Oregon, United States, part of which is a neighborhood of the city of Eugene, but most of which is an unincorporated area.  Prior to a number of partial annexations by the city between 1990 and 2005, Santa Clara was an unincorporated community and census-designated place in Lane County. Its current population is approximately 13,000.

According to U.S. Census Bureau figures, the racial composition of Santa Clara's population is 91 percent white, 0.8 percent black, 1.2 percent American Indian, 1.2 percent Asian, 0.2 percent Pacific Islander, 2.2 percent some other race, and 3.4 percent two or more races.  Latinos, who may be of any race, form 4.7 percent of Santa Clara's population.

Geography
Santa Clara is located on the banks of the Willamette River.  Its northern boundary is considered to be Beacon Drive in Eugene, the southern boundary is Oregon Route 569 (Randy Pape Belt Line Road), its western boundary is the Northwest Expressway, and its eastern boundary is the river.

Santa Clara has an elevation of 388 feet (118 m).

Approximately 40 percent of the land area of Santa Clara lies within the city limits of Eugene, while the remaining 60 percent is unincorporated.

Santa Clara, along with the River Road neighborhood, are extremely car-dependent. However, EMX's Moving Ahead initiative will create a dedicated bus rapid transit lane as well as more regular service to reduce the region's dependence on personal motor vehicles.

References

See also
Irving, Eugene, Oregon

Former census-designated places in Oregon
Neighborhoods in Eugene, Oregon
Unincorporated communities in Lane County, Oregon
Unincorporated communities in Oregon